People with the surname include: 
 David Hoggan (b.1961), Scottish footballer
 David L. Hoggan (1923–1988), American historian
 Dee Hoggan (b. 1990), Scottish bowler
 Frances Hoggan (1843–927), Welsh physician
 James Hoggan (1959–2020), Australian Paralympic athlete
 James Hoggan (b. 1946), Canadian businessman
 Jeff Hoggan (b. 1978), Canadian ice-hockeyer
 Ryan Hoggan (b. 1998), Scottish footballer

English-language surnames